Sinatra is a 1992 CBS biographical drama miniseries about singer Frank Sinatra, developed and executive produced by Frank's youngest daughter Tina Sinatra and approved by Frank himself. Directed by James Steven Sadwith, produced by Richard M. Rosenbloom, and written by William Mastrosimone and Abby Mann. It stars Philip Casnoff, Olympia Dukakis, Joe Santos, Gina Gershon, Nina Siemaszko, Bob Gunton, and Marcia Gay Harden, with some of Sinatra's vocals recreated by Tom Burlinson. It won two and was nominated for seven Emmy Awards, along with a win and two nominations for a Golden Globe Award. Released on November 8, 1992, it was re-released on a two-disc DVD Warner Home Video on May 13, 2008.

Plot
Frank Sinatra (Casnoff) emerges from Hoboken, New Jersey, the son of local politician Natalie "Dolly" Sinatra (Dukakis) and fireman Anthony "Marty" Sinatra (Santos). Beginning his career as a singer for the Harry James (Posey) and Tommy Dorsey (Gunton) big bands, Sinatra struggles to keep his marriage to his teenage sweetheart Nancy Barbato (Gershon). Before long, his talent catapults him to both music and movie fame, but his personal failings place his career and marriage in danger. He endures tumultuous marriages and divorces with starlets Ava Gardner (Harden) and Mia Farrow (Siemaszko) while juggling his movie and singing careers and forming significant friendships with an ambitious young senator named John F. Kennedy (Kelly) and powerful Chicago mob boss Sam Giancana (Steiger).

Cast
 Philip Casnoff as Frank Sinatra
 Olympia Dukakis as Natalie "Dolly" Sinatra
 Joe Santos as Marty Sinatra
 Gina Gershon as Nancy Barbato Sinatra
 Nina Siemaszko as Mia Farrow
 Joe Grifasi as George Evans
 Marcia Gay Harden as Ava Gardner
 Bob Gunton as Tommy Dorsey
 David Raynr as Sammy Davis Jr.
 Ralph Seymour as Budd
 Jeff Corey as Quinlin
 Danny Gans as Dean Martin
 Vincent Guastaferro as Hank Sanicola
 James F. Kelly as John F. Kennedy
 Matthew Posey as Harry James
 Rod Steiger as Salvatore Giancana
 Carol Barbee as Marilyn Maxwell
 David Byrd as Michael Romanoff
 Paul Collins as Westbrook Pegler
 Maggie Egan as Jo Stafford
 Brian Markinson as Sonny Werblin
 Tony Simotes as Buddy Rich
 John Wesley as Sy Oliver
 Marc Grady Adams as Lee Mortimer
 Tony Gaetano as Humphrey Bogart
 Leata Galloway as Billie Holiday
 David A. Kimball as Benny Goodman
 Bruce Gray as Fred Zinneman
 Shelly Lipkin as Joey Bishop
 Jack Betts as Earl Wilson
 Rena Riffel as May Britt
 Brad Blaisdell as Skitch Henderson
 Chris Weatherhead as Mercedes McCambridge
 Patricia Supancic as Nancy at 14
 Beverley Mitchell as Nancy at 7-9
 Samantha Ward as Nancy at 3
 Cameron Phillip Williams as Frank Jr. at 10
 Jameson Rodgers as Frank Jr. at 4-6
 Jenny Regli as Tina at 6
 Tom Burlinson as Frank Sinatra (singing voice)
 Floyd Levine as Director

Production

Filming
Filming was shot on location in Hoboken, New Jersey and at the Los Angeles Union Station in California.

Awards

Reception

The series got a mostly positive reception but was accused of whitewashing the controversial aspects of Frank Sinatira's life.

References

External links

1992 television films
1992 films
1990s biographical drama films
American biographical drama films
1990s American drama television series
American television films
1990s American television miniseries
American biographical series
Best Miniseries or Television Movie Golden Globe winners
Emmy Award-winning programs
Primetime Emmy Award-winning television series
English-language television shows
Films about Frank Sinatra
Cultural depictions of John F. Kennedy
Cultural depictions of Marilyn Monroe
Cultural depictions of Humphrey Bogart
Cultural depictions of Sammy Davis Jr.
Cultural depictions of Billie Holiday
Cultural depictions of Sam Giancana
CBS original programming
Films directed by James Steven Sadwith
1990s English-language films
1990s American films